Pavel Kolev (born 24 August 1975 in Sofia) is a Bulgarian retired football defender, and current Executive Director of Levski Sofia. He is also a football analyst.

References

External links
 

Bulgarian footballers
1975 births
Living people
Association football defenders
PFC Nesebar players
First Professional Football League (Bulgaria) players